Wallace "Ace" West is a superhero appearing in American comic books published by DC Comics. Originally introduced as a biracial interpretation of Wally West, as part of DC's The New 52 relaunch, the comic DC Rebirth #1 later established that he is, in fact, a new character of the same name, being the Reverse-Flash's son and Wally's cousin, both named after their great-grandfather. To avoid confusion, the character was renamed in later comics as Wallace West, and later simply as Ace West.

The character was inspired by a desire to feature an African-American iteration of Wally West in the Arrowverse series The Flash following the similarly black Jesse L. Martin's and Candice Patton's respective castings as Joe and Iris West; ultimately, Keiynan Lonsdale was cast as the character, depicted as West's long-lost brother, and additionally reprising the role in Legends of Tomorrow and Supergirl.

Publication history 
The "reintroduction" of this character to DC Comics following its 2011 The New 52 reboot, which removed Wally West from continuity, was first announced in January 2014. Originally conceived of as a biracial reinterpretation of the classic Wally West character. Wallace/Ace is stated in his introductory comics and creators as being the son of Iris West's brother Rudy, as in pre-New 52 stories. However, the original interpretation of Wally West, having been the starring character in the Flash for many years, was still missed by DC's fans, and so the company decided to bring the original Wally back into continuity in Geoff Johns' DC Rebirth #1 (2016). Rebirth retroactively established that the character's father was not Rudy, as previously stated; he was the son of Iris's other brother, the then-recently introduced Daniel West, also the latest incarnation of Reverse Flash, who had redeemed and sacrificed himself as a member of the Suicide Squad. Following his cousin's reintroduction, the character was depicted as going by their full name "Wallace", and later a new nickname, "Ace".

Fictional character biography 
Wallace "Ace" West (then-referred to as simply "Wally") first appears in The Flash (vol. 4) Annual #3 (June 2014) in a story set twenty years in the future, when a jaded, older Flash (Barry Allen) reads about the character's funeral and vows to change history. Tying in with the ongoing story The New 52: Futures End, the story The Flash: Futures End #1 depicts an encounter between Barry of five years in the future (when Wallace is supposed to die) and the Barry of 20 years in the future, who is out to prevent it. In the course of the story, Wallace ends up learning that Barry is the Flash and absorbs part of the Speed Force — the source of the Flash's abilities — during the battle between Barry and his future counterpart. He becomes a speedster but his hero career is short-lived; he sacrifices himself to fix a wound in the speed force. Due to the effects of time travel, however, this has implications for Wallace earlier in his history. Around the same time, in the present-day narrative of The Flash, Barry meets Wallace for the first time through Iris. He is struck by lightning and acquires super-speed abilities; an apparition of his future explains that, as a consequence of how his future-self had died repairing the Speed Force, all the power within him was able to travel back in time and use Wallace's lightning accident as a catalyst. Wallace's first act as a speedster is to use his powers to protect a classmate from a bully, using the same artistic elements as Professor Zoom's powers.

DC Rebirth #1, part of a company-wide event of the same name, marked DC's attempts to restore much of what it lost in the New 52 reboot, both in tone and in the stories of its characters. It features Wally West watching his younger cousin, Wallace, from outside of time, proud and amazed that he too has become a speedster, and reflecting on how they are both named for the same grandfather. Wally is brought back to reality by Barry, who remembers him for the first time since the events of Flashpoint. Teen Titans Rebirth #1, shows Wallace joining the Teen Titans superhero team as Kid Flash.

Wallace, as Kid Flash, meets Wally West, as the Flash, when assisting Barry in dealing with a bridge accident, although Wally doesn't explicitly introduce himself to his cousin, simply identifying himself as an ally of Barry, although Wallace accepts him after they work together to save Barry from a temporary infusion of Speed Force energy.

He later discovers that he has been created after Barry created Flashpoint timeline, abandoning his "Wally" nickname in favour of going by his full name of "Wallace", before ultimately going by the new short-hand nickname of "Ace" West.

Alternate versions

Futures End 
In The Flash: Futures End #1, the Flash from 20 years in the future is able to prevent Wallace's death by killing Daniel West. After the Future Flash cripples his younger self in their fight and disappears into the past, Barry finds that Wallace has been imbued with the Speed Force. He makes Wallace promise to stop his future self and Wallace dons a silver and red Flash suit, becoming the new Flash, and trains for years to travel back and stop the Future Flash.

In The Flash (vol. 4) #35, Wallace arrives to see the Future Flash fight the present Flash. Wallace is badly injured when he shields the younger Flash from high-speed rocks that the Future Flash flung. Wallace absorbs the excess Speed Force energy that is tearing apart the present Flash and tells him to not give up and that he only learned to be a hero because of him. Wallace dies and releases a blast of Speed Force energy that closes the rupture but unintentionally traps the present Flash in the Speed Force.

In other media

Television 

Wallace F. "Wally" West appears in media set in the Arrowverse, portrayed by Keiynan Lonsdale. This version is the younger brother of Iris West and son of Joe and Francine West, with the latter having raised Wally away from the rest of his family before Iris and Joe learn of him following Francine's death. Additionally, Wally is described as "a bit of a wayward kid who has some attitude problems and some authority issues and is quick with a sassy remark".

 Introduced as a civilian in the second season of The Flash, Wally becomes Kid Flash in the third season, originally due to Barry Allen creating and undoing the "Flashpoint" timeline before Doctor Alchemy restores the former's powers to free his master Savitar from the Speed Force. Despite this, Wally becomes Barry's partner in crime-fighting and briefly dates Jesse Quick until she breaks up with him in the fourth season. Following this, he would temporarily join the Legends (see below) and eventually leaves for Keystone City to find himself.
 Wally also appears in the third season of Legends of Tomorrow and the crossover "Crisis on Earth-X".

Film 
Ace West / Kid Flash makes a non-speaking cameo appearance in Justice League Dark: Apokolips War as a member of the Teen Titans who is killed by Darkseid's Paradooms.

Video games 
 Ace West / Kid Flash makes a cameo appearance in the Flash's ending in Injustice 2. 
 Wallace West / Kid Flash appears as a playable character in Lego DC Super-Villains, voiced by Jason Linere White.

References 

Comics characters introduced in 2014
DC Comics characters who can move at superhuman speeds
DC Comics characters with superhuman senses
DC Comics characters with accelerated healing
DC Comics metahumans
DC Comics male superheroes
DC Comics superheroes
DC Comics sidekicks
DC Comics child superheroes
African-American superheroes
Fictional characters from Nebraska
Flash (comics) characters
Fictional characters who can turn intangible
Fictional characters who can manipulate light
Fictional characters with air or wind abilities
Fictional characters with absorption or parasitic abilities
Fictional characters who can manipulate sound
Fictional characters with electric or magnetic abilities
Fictional characters with dimensional travel abilities
Fictional characters with anti-magic or power negation abilities 
Fictional characters who can manipulate time 
Fictional characters with density control abilities
Time travelers